Zenobia Shroff is an Indian-born American actress. Shroff has been an actress, writer, teaching artist and sketch comedienne for over 30 years and she is known for her role in the 2017 film The Big Sick, and as Muneeba Khan in the Disney+ TV series Ms. Marvel.

Early life
Shroff grew up in a Parsi family in South Bombay, in what is now known as Mumbai.

Career
Shroff began her professional career at age sixteen as a commercial print model. After seven successful years as a model, she switched to acting. She got her acting start in Mumbai under the mentorship of Pearl Padamsee. She then moved to study acting at New York City's Circle in the Square Theatre School. Soon after, she appeared at the Broadway Castillo Theatre, where she played several roles such as Nora in Henrik Ibsen's A Doll's House to German avant-gardist Heiner Müller. She also performed in Erotic Adventures in Venice at the La MaMa Experimental Theatre Club and in Milan Kundera's Jacques and His Master.

2007–2016
In 2007, she was cast as Roxanne in Little Zizou, written and directed by Sooni Taraporevala. For that role she was nominated as best actress at the New York Indian film festival. A few years later, she appeared in When Harry Tries to Marry, an American romantic comedy film. She followed that up with her first Bollywood film, Ek Main Aur Ekk Tu alongside Imran Khan. The film received critical acclaim. Her solo show, Show How to Succeed as an Ethnically Ambiguous Actor premiered at the Planet Connections Festival in June 2016. For that performance she has been nominated as Outstanding Solo Performer.

Shroff has been a lifelong dancer, starting with the classical Indian temple dance, Bharat Natyam for several years and moving onto jazz and modern as a young adult. She is a founding company member of the Shiamak Davar dance company with whom she toured nationally doing musical theatre including playing Anita in West Side Story, Cabaret, and A Chorus Line.

2017–present
She has performed stand up at the Guild Gallery, the Indo American Arts Council, Don't Tell Mama, UCB and the South Asian International Performing Arts Festival. She went on to perform her show, Show How to Succeed as an Ethnically Ambiguous Actor, with over 30 characters in and off Broadway at the Castillo Theatre in a full run in the summer of 2017. Also in 2017, she was cast as Kumail Nanjiani's mother in The Big Sick, produced by Judd Apatow. The cast was nominated for a Screen Actors Guild Awards in 2018.

She has appeared in the American medical drama series The Resident, American political drama television series Madam Secretary, and a recurring role as Priya Ullah in seasons 4 and 5 of The Affair. In 2020, she voiced one of the many counselors named “Jerry”, in the Disney-Pixar film Soul.

In 2022, she was cast as Muneeba Khan in the Marvel Studios series Ms. Marvel on Disney+. She is set to reprise the role in the upcoming 2023 film The Marvels.

Personal life 
She holds a master's degree in Psychology.

Filmography

Film

Television

References

External links
 

1965 births
People from Mumbai
Living people
Indian film actresses
Indian television actresses
Indian emigrants to the United States
American film actresses
American television actresses
American voice actresses
American women comedians
American actresses of Indian descent
American people of Parsi descent
American Zoroastrians
American expatriate actresses in India
Actresses in Hindi cinema
Circle in the Square Theatre School alumni
20th-century American actresses
21st-century American actresses